Ricky Garcia may refer to:
Ricky García (footballer) (born 1971), Honduran footballer
Ricky Garcia, German musician
Ricky Garcia (actor), American actor and singer

See also
Ricardo Garcia (disambiguation)

Ricky also appears in Alexa and Katie in a few episodes